Park Seung-hi (born 28 March 1992) is a former South Korean short track and long track speed skater. She is the 2010 Overall World Champion. She won two gold medals and three bronze medals at 2010 Winter Olympics and 2014 Winter Olympics. Her sister is Park Seung-ju, a long track speed skater, and her brother Park Se-yeong, a short track speed skater. She switched to long-track speed skating after the 2014 Sochi Olympics. After the 2018 Pyeongchang Olympics Park announced her retirement from speedskating.

Career
At the 2010 Winter Olympics, she competed in four events. In her first event, the 500 m, she was disqualified in the quarterfinals. Three days later, she competed in the 1500 m. Despite setting an Olympic record in the semifinals, she finished third in the final. In the 3000 m relay, her team finished first but was disqualified by one of the track judges. In the 1000 m, she won a bronze medal, finishing behind Wang Meng and Katherine Reutter.

At the 2014 Winter Olympics, she won two gold medals and a bronze.

After the 2014–15 season Park switched to long track speed skating where she qualified to represent South Korea at the 2015 World Single Distance Speed Skating Championships. She had originally planned on retiring from speedskating altogether after Sochi but wanted to challenge herself to skate in long track and also have the honor of competing in her home country in the 2018 Winter Olympics. She became the first South Korean athlete to ever compete in short track and long track speedskating at the Olympics.

At the 2018 Winter Olympics in Pyeongchang, Park competed in the women's 1000 metres event for speed skating, finishing 16th overall.

Personal life 
In July 2022, Park announced her first child's pregnancy via Instagram. In January 2023, Park's agency announced Park had given birth to their first daughter on January 12.

International competition podiums

Short track speed skating

References

External links
 
 Park Seung-Hi at ShorttrackOnLine.info.
 
 

1992 births
Living people
South Korean female short track speed skaters
Olympic short track speed skaters of South Korea
Short track speed skaters at the 2010 Winter Olympics
Short track speed skaters at the 2014 Winter Olympics
Olympic gold medalists for South Korea
Olympic bronze medalists for South Korea
Olympic medalists in short track speed skating
South Korean female speed skaters
Medalists at the 2010 Winter Olympics
Medalists at the 2014 Winter Olympics
Asian Games medalists in short track speed skating
Short track speed skaters at the 2011 Asian Winter Games
Speed skaters at the 2017 Asian Winter Games
Asian Games gold medalists for South Korea
Asian Games silver medalists for South Korea
Medalists at the 2011 Asian Winter Games
Speed skaters at the 2018 Winter Olympics
Olympic speed skaters of South Korea
People from Suwon
Sportspeople from Gyeonggi Province